Langenhoven is an Afrikaans surname. Notable people with the surname include:

Bradley Langenhoven (born 1983), South African rugby union player
Cornelis Jacobus Langenhoven (1873–1932), South African poet
Hilton Langenhoven (born 1983), South African athlete

Afrikaans-language surnames